EkipaSN is a daily sports newspaper published in Ljubljana, Slovenia.

History and profile
Ekipa was first published in 2000. It is a sports paper and is published by Salomon Group. 

The circulation of Ekipa was 25,000 copies in 2003. The 2007 circulation of the paper was 14,900 copies. Its circulation was 30,000 copies in 2013.

References

2000 establishments in Slovenia
Newspapers published in Slovenia
Sports mass media in Slovenia
Slovene-language newspapers
Newspapers established in 2000
Sports newspapers
Mass media in Ljubljana